Kenya–South Korea relations are bilateral relations between Kenya and South Korea.

History

Ties between Kenya and South Korea date back to February 1964.

Tourism
In 2012, 9,400 Koreans visited Kenya. That made South Korea the fourth largest source of visitors from Asia to Kenya after India, China and Japan.

State visits
In 2016, Former President Park Geun-hye of South Korea made a state visit to Kenya as part of her Africa tour.

Numerous agreements were signed to improve cooperation in various fields as well as improve bilateral relations.

In 2018 Prime Minister Lee Nak-yeon visited Kenya. He held talks with President Kenyatta. They discussed deepening bilateral ties and increasing trade.

In 2012, South Korean Prime Minister Kim Hwang-sik visited Kenya. He held talks with President Mwai Kibaki and Prime Minister Raila Odinga.

Kenyan Prime Minister Raila Odinga also visited South Korea in 2012. He held talks with Prime Minister Kim Hwang-sik.

In November 2022, President William Ruto made a bilateral state visit to South Korea. He held talks with President Yoon Suk-yeol.

Incidences

In June 2012, Korean Air started flying from Seoul to Nairobi. To promote the launch of the flights Korean Air's Twitter feed stated, “...Fly to Korean Air and enjoy the grand African Savanna, the safari tour, and the indigenous people full of primitive energy.” Kenyans exposed their anger on social media. They particularly expressed concern that the airline called them primitive. The airline later on apologised over the matter, it stated that the mishap was as a result of wrong translation from Korean to English.

In late 2014, Korean Air flights were suspended to the West African ebola crisis. Flights are set to resume in July 2015.

Trade
Bilateral trade between both countries is worth KES. 30.2 billion (US$330 million). Kenya exports about KES. 2.74 billion (US$30 million) worth of goods to South Korea. South Korea exports about KES. 27.4 billion (US$300 million) worth of goods to Kenya. In 2009, Kenya exported about KES. 90 million (US$1 million) worth of coffee to Korea, in 2013 the figure rose to KES. 540 million (US$6 million).

Main exports from Kenya to Korea include: tobacco, coffee, scrap metal, gemstones, pyrethrum, spices, fish, wood products, handicrafts and beer.

Main exports from Korea to Kenya include: iron & steel products, plastics, electrical machinery, ICT equipment, chemicals, rubber products, pharmaceuticals, motor vehicles.

Both countries signed MOUs and agreements to improve trade, oversee grants and development assistance, promotion and protection of investments in Kenya and Korea and an agreement on the avoidance of double taxation.

Trade between Kenya and South Korea
(in billions Kenyan Shillings )

FDI and Infrastructure
Many South Korean firms such as  Samsung, LG and Hyundai maintain their regional headquarters in Nairobi. Samsung announced plans to set up a TV assembly plant in Kenya. In 2012, Daewoo was awarded a deal worth KES. 119 billion (US$1.3 billion) to construct a power plant in Kilifi County, Kenya.

Diplomatic missions
South Korea maintains an embassy in Nairobi. Kenya has an embassy in Seoul, which was opened in 2007.

See also
 Kenya–North Korea relations

External links 
 Embassy of the Republic of Kenya in Seoul
 Embassy of South Korea in Nairobi

References

Bilateral relations of South Korea
Korea, South